Géza Wertheim (3 July 1910 – 10 August 1979) was a Luxembourgian tennis player and bobsledder.

He made thirty appearances for Luxembourg in the Davis Cup between 1947 and 1957, losing all thirty.  He later became President of the Luxembourg Tennis Federation.

He also competed for Luxembourg in the two-man bobsleigh at the 1936 Winter Olympics in Garmisch-Partenkirchen, where the team of Wertheim and Raoul Weckbecker, finished last of twenty-two.

References 
 1936 bobsleigh two-man results
 1936 Olympic Winter Games official report. - p. 419.
 COSL-ALO profile 
 Géza Wertheim's profile at Sports Reference.com

External links
 

1910 births
1979 deaths
Bobsledders at the 1936 Winter Olympics
Luxembourgian male bobsledders
Luxembourgian male tennis players
Olympic bobsledders of Luxembourg
People from Mamer
Presidents of the Luxembourg Tennis Federation